Archibald Dalzel (1740–1818) was a Scottish colonial administrator and slave trader who served as governor of the Gold Coast from
1792 to 1802. Between 1804 and 1808 he owned two enslaving ships. He died in 1818.

Life
Dalzel was born in Kirkliston in Scotland and he trained to be a doctor in Edinburgh. After a spell in the navy he resolved to take a job in Africa as he saw it as a way to make money. He went to Africa as a surgeon in 1763 but started trading slaves to add to his salary. He served four years as governor of Whydah (now Ouidah, Benin). He observed that the people at Whydah "pay a kind of veneration to a particular species of large snake, which is very gentle." Dalzal returned to England in 1770.

Appointed by the Committee of Merchants that was in charge of the Gold Coast at the time, he served as governor in two periods: 31 March 1792 - 16 December 1798, and 28 April 1800 - 30 September 1802. Whilst he was there his daughter Elizabeth Dickson was born.

In 1793 he published The history of Dahomy, an inland kingdom of Africa; comp. from authentic memoirs; with an introduction and notes where he argued that the raiding of Dahomean villages for slaves was saving them from the greater evil of being human sacrifices.

Shipowner
In 1775 he purchased the schooner Nancy, of 60 tons (bm). On 19 September 1775, he sailed to Africa. At some point he purchased Hannah to act as a ship's tender for Nancy. As of February 2023 it is not clear about what happened to either vessel.

In 1804 Dalzel purchased the slave ship . She made two enslaving voyages while under his ownership. In all she delivered 486 captives to the West Indies. After the passage of the Slave Trade Act 1807, which ended British participation in the trans-Atlantic enslaving trade, Dalzel sold her.

In 1805, Dalzel purchased a second enslaving ship, . She made one complete voyage. She was wrecked in 1808 on her second enslaving voyage; crew and captives were saved.

Family
Son of William Dalziel (1705-1751) a carpenter from Kirkliston and Alice Linn.  Brother of Andrew Dalzel (1742-1806), Professor of Greek, Honorary Librarian at Edinburgh University.

External links and references 

 Grinker, Roy Richard & Steiner, Christopher B. (1997). Perspectives on Africa: A Reader in Culture, History and Representation, pp. xvii-xxxi. Oxford: Blackwell Publishers. .
 http://rulers.org/rulg1.html#ghana

1740 births
1811 deaths
History of Ghana
Governors of the Gold Coast (British colony)
Scottish slave traders